This article is about the particular significance of the year 1959 to Wales and its people.

Incumbents

Minister of Welsh Affairs – Henry Brooke
Archbishop of Wales – Edwin Morris, Bishop of Monmouth
Archdruid of the National Eisteddfod of Wales – William Morris

Events

1 January – The 1st The Queen's Dragoon Guards (informally known as the "Welsh Cavalry") is formed.
February – The Queen makes the red dragon on a green and white background the official flag of Wales.
4 May – Aneurin Bevan is elected deputy leader of the Labour Party.
6 August – Huw T. Edwards leaves the Labour Party for Plaid Cymru in protest at the decision to flood the Tryweryn valley.
8 October – At the UK general election:
Newly elected MPs include John Morris (Aberavon); Donald Box (Cardiff North); Ifor Davies (Gower) and Geraint Morgan (Denbigh).
Poet Waldo Williams stands as a Plaid Cymru candidate.
Hugh Dalton retires from Parliament.
The Local Government Commission for Wales is set up, chaired by Sir Guildhaume Myrddin-Evans.
Sir William Jones resigns from the Council for Wales and Monmouthshire in protest at the appointment of Henry Brooke.
Will Paynter becomes Secretary of the National Union of Mineworkers (Great Britain).
Gomer Berry, 1st Viscount Kemsley, sells his holdings in Kemsley Newspapers to Roy Thomson.
Gilbern Sports Cars begin production of their kit cars at Llantwit Fardre, Pontypridd, Glamorgan.

Arts and literature

8 January – Sir Lewis Casson and Dame Sybil Thorndike celebrate their 50th wedding anniversary (last December) by appearing together in Eighty in the Shade, a play written especially for them, in London.
9 January – Shirley Bassey is the first Welsh singer to hit number one in the UK singles chart, with "As I Love You".
December – Actress Siân Phillips marries Peter O'Toole in Dublin.
Literature Wales is established as The Academi.
Harry Secombe is voted Show Business Personality of the Year.

Awards

National Eisteddfod of Wales (held in Caernarfon)
National Eisteddfod of Wales: Chair – T. Llew Jones
National Eisteddfod of Wales: Crown – Tom Huws
National Eisteddfod of Wales: Prose Medal – William Owen

New books

English language
Menna Gallie – Strike for a Kingdom
Edgar Phillips – Edmund Jones, "The Old Prophet" 
Bertrand Russell – My Philosophical Development

Welsh language
Albert Evans-Jones – Cerddi Cynan, y casgliad cyflawn
D. Gwenallt Jones – Gwreiddiau
Kate Roberts – Te yn y Grug

Music
Grace Williams – All Seasons shall be Sweet

Film
Rachel Thomas, Meredith Edwards and Megs Jenkins appear with John Mills and Hayley Mills in Tiger Bay.
Hugh Griffith wins the Academy Award for Best Supporting Actor for his role in Ben-Hur.

Broadcasting
Statistics show that 50% of households in Wales have television licences.
The BBC Third Programme becomes available on VHF from Wenvoe.

Welsh-language television
Lili Lon (children's programme)
Trysor o Gân (Treasury of Song)

English-language television
Ivor the Engine (children's programme)

Sports
Athletics – The Welsh Games are held for the first time.
Boxing – Former world flyweight champion Jimmy Wilde is elected to the American Boxing Hall of Fame.
BBC Wales Sports Personality of the Year – Graham Moore

Births
30 January – Cynthia Carter, journalist, author, and academic
25 February – Mike Peters, musician
21 March – Colin Jones, boxer
24 April – Paula Yates, television presenter (died 2000)
3 May – Eddie Niedzwiecki, footballer
8 May – Jillian Evans MEP, politician
17 May – Paul Whitehouse, comedian
20 May – Annabel Giles, model
28 May – Steve Strange, born Steven Harrington, pop singer/promoter (died 2015)
18 June – Jocelyn Davies AM, politician
5 September – Mike Ruddock, rugby coach
7 November – Richard Barrett, composer
26 November – Dai Davies MP, politician
date unknown – Paul Henry, poet

Deaths

1 January – Dan Jones, Wales international rugby player, 83
13 January – Henry Weale, Victoria Cross recipient, 61
3 February – Sir Evan Williams, 1st Baronet, industrialist, 87
21 February – Kathleen Freeman, classical scholar, 61
24 February – Sid Judd, international rugby player, 30
3 March – Billy Bancroft, rugby and cricket player, 88
21 April – David Bell, writer and curator, 43
26 May – Thomas Baker Jones, Wales international rugby player, 96
18 June – Nantlais Williams, poet and preacher, 84
2 July – Ivor Davies, rugby player, 67 
7 July – Frank Williams, Wales international rugby player, 49
23 July – George Davies, international rugby player, 83
5 August – D. W. Davis, Governor of Idaho, 86
9 August – John Hart Evans, rugby player, 78
15 October – Thomas Wynford Rees, army officer, 61
23 October – Anthony Windham Jones, rugby player, 80
16 November – Fanny Winifred Edwards, teacher and writer, 83
17 November – David Owen Morgan, zoologist, 66
27 November – Grenville Morris, footballer, 81
10 December – W. R. Davies, US academic of Welsh descent, 66 (heart attack)
28 December – David Brazell, singer, 84
30 December – Dick Duckfield, cricketer, 52

See also
1959 in Northern Ireland

References

 
Wales